The Iglesia de Santa María La Real de La Corte is a church in Oviedo,  Asturias, Spain. It was established in the mid 16th century.

See also
Asturian art
Catholic Church in Spain

References

Roman Catholic churches in Oviedo
16th-century establishments in Spain